Christopher M. Goff (born 1972) is the 110th Associate Justice of the Indiana Supreme Court.

Biography

Goff was born in 1972 and raised in Wabash, Indiana. He received his undergraduate degree from Ball State University in 1994 and his Juris Doctor from Indiana University Maurer School of Law in 1996. Upon graduation from law school he was a partner at Mills, Northrop & Goff in Huntington, Indiana.

Superior court service
He served as a Judge on the Wabash County Superior Court from 2005 until his appointment to the Supreme Court. During his tenure on the superior court he established the Wabash County Drug Court and the Wabash County Family Drug Treatment Court.

Service on Supreme Court of Indiana
Goff was one of three candidates for a seat on the Supreme Court of Indiana, after the retirement of Robert D. Rucker. On June 12, 2017 Governor Eric Holcomb selected him to be the next appointment to the Supreme Court. He was officially sworn in on July 24, 2017.

Personal life
Goff and his wife, Raquel, have four children.

References

1972 births
Living people
20th-century American lawyers
21st-century American judges
Ball State University alumni
Indiana lawyers
Justices of the Indiana Supreme Court
Indiana University Maurer School of Law alumni
People from Wabash County, Indiana
Superior court judges in the United States